Portrait of Martino Martini is a painting by the Walloon artist Michaelina Wautier. Painted in 1654, it shows the Jesuit missionary Martino Martini. The work hangs in the Klesch private collection.

References

Paintings by Michaelina Wautier
Portraits of men
1654 paintings